The Moon pebblesnail, scientific name Somatogyrus obtusus,  is a species of very small freshwater snail that has an operculum, an aquatic gastropod mollusk in the family Hydrobiidae.

This species is endemic to the United States.  Its natural habitat is rivers.

References

Molluscs of the United States
Somatogyrus
Gastropods described in 1904
Taxonomy articles created by Polbot